The Mayor of Fermo is an elected politician who, along with the Fermo's City Council, is accountable for the strategic government of Fermo in Marche, Italy. The current Mayor is Paolo Calcinaro, an independent politician of a centrist local Civic List, who took office on 17 June 2015.

Overview
According to the Italian Constitution, the Mayor of Fermo is member of the City Council.

The Mayor is elected by the population of Fermo, who also elects the members of the City Council, controlling the Mayor's policy guidelines and is able to enforce his resignation by a motion of no confidence. The Mayor is entitled to appoint and release the members of his government.

Since 1993 the Mayor is elected directly by Fermo's electorate: in all mayoral elections in Italy in cities with a population higher than 15,000 the voters express a direct choice for the mayor or an indirect choice voting for the party of the candidate's coalition. If no candidate receives at least 50% of votes, the top two candidates go to a second round after two weeks. The election of the City Council is based on a direct choice for the candidate with a preference vote: the candidate with the majority of the preferences is elected. The number of the seats for each party is determined proportionally.

Italian Republic (since 1946)

City Council election (1946-1993)

From 1946 to 1993, the Mayor of Fermo was elected by the City's Council.

Direct election (since 1993)
Since 1993, under provisions of new local administration law, the Mayor of Fermo is chosen by direct election.

References

Fermo
 
People from Fermo
Politics of le Marche
Fermo